Nolin River Lake is a reservoir in Edmonson, Grayson, and Hart counties in Kentucky. It was impounded from the Nolin River by the United States Army Corps of Engineers in 1963. The Nolin River dam was authorized in 1938 as part of a flood control act. The lake varies from 2,890 acres (11.7 km2) in the winter to 5,795 acres (23.5 km2) in the summer.

Nearby attractions include Mammoth Cave National Park, Nolin Lake State Park, Moutardier Resort and Marina, Ponderosa Boat Dock/Marina and Wax Marina. Moutardier is an unincorporated community that abuts Nolin River Lake.

References

External links
 US Army Corps of Engineers page on Nolin Lake
 Nolin Lake State Park facilities map
 Nolin Lake State Park interactive GIS map

1963 establishments in Kentucky
Protected areas of Edmonson County, Kentucky
Protected areas of Grayson County, Kentucky
Protected areas of Hart County, Kentucky
Reservoirs in Kentucky
Buildings and structures in Edmonson County, Kentucky
Buildings and structures in Grayson County, Kentucky
Buildings and structures in Hart County, Kentucky
Dams in Kentucky
Dams completed in 1963
United States Army Corps of Engineers dams
Bodies of water of Edmonson County, Kentucky
Bodies of water of Grayson County, Kentucky
Bodies of water of Hart County, Kentucky